Juan Sebastián Cabal and Robert Farah were the defending champions but decided not to participate.
Dudi Sela and Harel Srugo won the final against Adrien Bossel and Michael McClune 6–2, 3–6, [10].

Seeds

Draw

Draw

References
 Main draw
 Qualifying draw

Doubles